The men's high jump was an event at the 1956 Summer Olympics in Melbourne, Australia. Twenty-eight contestants from 19 nations met on the morning of the first day of the athletic contests, on Friday November 23, 1956, and 22 cleared the qualifying height of 1.92 metres, to meet again in the afternoon. The maximum number of athletes per nation had been set at 3 since the 1930 Olympic Congress. The event was won by Charles Dumas of the United States, the nation's second consecutive and 11th overall victory in the men's high jump. Chilla Porter's silver was Australia's second medal in the event (after a gold in 1948). Igor Kashkarov's bronze was the Soviet Union's first.

Summary

Charles Dumas, Chilla Porter and Igor Kashkarov cleared 2.06 metres on their first attempts. Stig Pettersson cleared it on his third. Dumas was in third place after a miss at 2.03m. At 2.08m, Dumas and Kashkarov cleared on their first attempt, while Porter dropped to third place by making it on his second. Pettersson did not clear the height. Dumas held the lead with a second attempt clearance of 2.10m while Porter made it on his last attempt. Kashkarov did not clear it and earned bronze. On his final attempt, Dumas set the final new Olympic record with 2.12 metres, while Porter couldn't clear that height and won silver.

Background

This was the 13th appearance of the event, which is one of 12 athletics events to have been held at every Summer Olympics. The returning finalists from the 1952 Games were bronze medalist José da Conceição of Brazil and eleventh-place finisher Peter Wells of Great Britain. Charles Dumas was the favorite, having broken the 7-foot mark at the U.S. trials with a 2.15 metres world record. Sweden's Bengt Nilsson was the 1954 European champion and the only non-American considered a contender for gold, but he "was injured shortly before leaving for Melbourne."

Jamaica, Kenya, and Uganda each made their debut in the event. The United States appeared for the 13th time, having competed at each edition of the Olympic men's high jump to that point.

Competition format

The competition used the two-round format introduced in 1912. There were two distinct rounds of jumping with results cleared between rounds. The qualifying round had the bar set at 1.70 metres, 1.78 metres, 1.82 metres, 1.88 metres, and 1.92 metres. All jumpers clearing 1.92 metres in the qualifying round advanced to the final. The final had jumps at 1.80 metres, 1.86 metres, 1.92 metres, 1.96 metres, 2.00 metres, 2.03 metres, 2.06 metres, and then increased by 0.02 metres until a winner was found. Each athlete had three attempts at each height.

Records

The world and Olympic records (in metres) prior to the 1956 Summer Olympics:

The existing Olympic record was equaled or bettered ten times by four men over the course of the 5 hour long competition. Charles Dumas finished with the new Olympic record at 2.12 metres.

Schedule

All times are Australian Eastern Standard Time (UTC+10)

Results

Qualifying

Okamona and Vernon retired due to injuries.

Final

References

External links

 Results

High jump men
1956
Men's events at the 1956 Summer Olympics